Dr. Betsy Chernak Taylor was a fictional character on the cancelled American soap opera, Love is a Many Splendored Thing.  She was played by actress/singer Andrea Marcovicci.

Liberated lady doctor 

Betsy was the liberated daughter of Lily Chernak, one of a large family who lived in San Francisco, California.  She worked with Dr. Will Donnelly, a pathologist, who encouraged and supported the young woman.  Later on, Dr. Will, her boss, married her mother, Lily.  The day that her mother got married, was the same day that she also married her longtime boyfriend, Joe Taylor (Leon Russom).

Betsy also got to know her new stepsiblings, Tom Donnelly, his wife, Helen; her two stepsisters, Iris and Laura Elliott; not to mention her step nephew, Ricky Donnelly, (Shawn Campbell), Tom's son from his first marriage to a woman named Martha Donnelly/Julie Richards (Beverlee McKinsey).

Presumably, Betsy and Joe are still living in San Francisco, and are happy in their lives.  He works, and she still is a doctor, presumably a pathologist, much like her beloved mentor and her stepfather, Dr. Will Donnelly.

Taylor, Betsy Chernak